The Moreton state by-election, 1909 was a by-election held on 19 June 1909 for the Queensland Legislative Assembly seat of Moreton, based to the north of Brisbane.

The by-election was triggered by the death of Ministerial member John Dunmore Campbell on 27 May 1909. Campbell had held the seat since 1899. He was a minister in the short-lived Second Philp Ministry prior to the 1908 election.

The seat, later known as Murrumba, was based in Caboolture and included all of what is now the Moreton Bay Region, the former City of Caloundra and the towns of Nambour and Eumundi.

Timeline

Results
James Forsythe retained the seat for the Ministerial party.

References 

1909 elections in Australia
Queensland state by-elections
1900s in Queensland